Auzata amaryssa is a moth in the family Drepanidae. It was described by Hong-Fu Chu and Lin-Yao Wang in 1988. It is found in the Chinese provinces of Fujian and Jiangxi.

The length of the forewings is 15–17 mm. Adults are similar to Auzata chinensis, but there is a patch on the forewings with a whitish marking on it.

References

Moths described in 1988
Drepaninae
Moths of Asia